The Fraternity of Delta Omega Epsilon (official name Delta Omega Epsilon Incorporated) was founded on April 15, 1985 at the campus of The College of Staten Island. Delta Omega Epsilon was the first fraternity to be chartered at the school. It was a co-ed Greek organization until it was believed that a sister sorority should be broken off called Sigma Omega Epsilon. Delta Omega Epsilon was established to form a brotherhood, something that reaches beyond friendship. On Feb 10th, 2011 Delta Omega Epsilon officially became incorporated.

Symbols
The official symbols of the fraternity are the Phoenix and the Dolphin. Its colors are black and silver.

Goals
To encourage and assist the academic progress of fraternity brothers.
To provide free tutorial and counseling to fraternity brothers.
To give a sense of brotherhood and while attending school.
To provide students with an opportunity for a business-like experience in a fraternity corporation.
To expand the idea of multiculturalism on college campuses.
To learn and build on ideas on professionalism and advancement in the community.

Their mottos include:
"A brotherhood, something that reaches beyond that of a friendship."
"It takes discipline, dedication, and determination to be dynamic and prosperous."

Chapters

These are the chapters of Delta Omega Epsilon. Active chapters noted in bold, inactive chapters in italics.

References

Fraternities and sororities in the United States
Student organizations established in 1985
1985 establishments in New York City